Rerukane Chandawimala Thero was a Sri Lankan Buddhist monk and author. A personality of Sri Lankan Buddhism in the 20th century, he has been regarded as one of the finest scholars of Tripitaka, the sacred canon of Theravada Buddhism. He was also a Buddhist meditation master, professor of Abhidharma and a former Maha Nayaka of the Swegin chapter of the Amarapura Nikaya. Rerukane Chandawimala Thero was a highly reputed author of Theravada Buddhism, especially on Abhidharma. His books are considered as text books by other authors as well as students.

Early life and education
Rerukane Chandawimala Thera was born on 19 July 1897 in the village Rerukana in Kalutara district, western Sri Lanka. His lay name was Rubel Gunawardene. The eldest of a family of 06 children, Rubel's parents were Don Bastian de Paules Gunawardene and Munasinghage Podi Nona.  After having his school education at Veediyagoda school up to grade 2, young Rubel entered the order of Buddhist monks as a Samanera (novice monk) on 8 January 1906. His teacher was Burmese Buddhist monk U. Vinayalankara Maha Thera who resided in Pokunuwita temple those days.

Rerukane Chandawimala Samanera left Sri Lanka on 27 January 1908 to receive his monastic education in Burma. After having monastic education for 10 years he received his higher ordination Upasampada on 26 October 1917 at ‘’Dhammikarama Seema malaka’’ in Burma. During his stay in Burma, Rerukane Chandawimala Thera had a good education on Tripitka, specially on Abhidharma (Buddhist Meta Physics) and Buddhist meditation. Rerukane Chandawimala Thero returned to Sri Lanka in 1918.

Work and honours
Rerukane Chandawimala Thero started writing books at the age of 29. His first book was ‘’Niravana Vinishchaya’’ (Judging the enlightenment). He soon became the chief prelate of the Pokunuwita temple and thereafter devoted his entire time for meditation, Buddhist literary works and to solve the problems on Buddhist philosophy presented to him by the other monks and laity. He authored more than 30 highly reputed books on Buddhism. His work on Abhidharma and Vipassana mediation gained him high respect and reputation. Chandawimala Thero also served as a master and instructor to his students as well as others who were interested in Buddhist meditation.

Rerukane Chandawimala thero received lot of honorary titles and degrees for his service to the Buddhism. He received the honorary degree  of ‘’Sahithya Chakarawarthi’’ (emperor of literature) from Vidyalankara University in 1963. Vidyalankara University also offered him the honorary post of professor of Abhidharma. In addition to those degrees he also received the Panditha degree conferred by the ’’ Pracheena Bhashopakara Samagama.’’ Rerukane Chandawimala thero became the Mahanayaka of Sri Lanka Swegin chapter of the Amarapura Nikaya in 1976. In 1995, he received the titles ‘’Pravachana Visharda’’  and Amarapura Maha Mahopadyaya Shasana Sobhana at the age of 98.

Criticisms

The reliability of Professor Rerukane Chandawimala Thero is rarely questioned since he is a scholar of Burmese tradition of Theravada Buddhism, having lived and learned in Burma for a decade since the age of 10. On return to Thero's birth country, Sri Lanka he wrote many damma books especially on Abhidharma (Sanskrit) or Abhidhamma (Pali) .

In "Upasampada sheelaya (Virtues of Upasampada)" (1930?), Professor Rerukane Chandawimala Thero characterized certain unholy acts by ordained, well established Theravada monk a minor digression. Thero prescribed that a simple private discussion will purify the monk, who act against the precepts prescribed in damma. Such a private discussion would nullify demerits of undisciplined act the Thero wrote in Upasampada sheelaya (Virtues of Upasampada) book.

Death and funeral
Rerukane Chandawimala thero died on 4 July 1997, due to natural causes at his temple in Pokunuwita. His death occurred two weeks before his 100th birthday. His funeral was done according to the last will and the instructions he has given to his pupils in the early 1980s. Maha Nayaka thero requested for no state funeral, no publicity in the media, no banners, no ringing of his temple bell and stated that all he had wanted was for his body be cremated within the temple premises, with no coffin. He also requested not to keep his body more than 24 hours after his death and his funeral was conducted according to his last will and instructions in a very simple manner. Rerukane Chandawimala thero had used a rough wooden bed to sleep on and his bodily remains was carried on an equally rough wooden structure and cremated in a rough wood pyre, bereft of any decoration. Rerukane Chandawimala Thero was the Maha Nayaka of the Swegin chapter of Amarapura Nikaya for a period of over two decades from 1976 until his death in July 1997.

Books (selection)
The following are some of the notable books written by Rerukane Chandawimala Thero.

References

External links
 Rerukane Maha Nahimi (Website)
 Rerukane Chandawimala Maha Nahimi, Biography by Iththepana Dammalankara Thera
 Books by Ven, Reukane Chandawimalla Himi 

1897 births
1997 deaths
Theravada Buddhist monks
Sri Lankan Theravada Buddhists
Sri Lankan Buddhist monks
Theravada Buddhism writers
Sinhalese monks
20th-century Buddhist monks